Municipal and mayoral elections were held in Marseille in March 2008, at the same time as other French municipal elections. The incumbent Mayor of the city, Jean-Claude Gaudin (UMP) faced Socialist candidate and Senator Jean-Noël Guérini. While polls in January and February indicated that Gaudin was safe, later polls showed the race tied and the 3rd sector of the city, a marginal UMP area, was likely to decide the election. Elections in Marseille depend not on the number of votes polled but the number of sectors won (there are 8 sectors). The same system applies in Lyon and Paris.

Gaudin was re-elected and served as mayor till 2020.

Results

1st Sector

2nd Sector

3rd Sector

4th Sector

5th Sector

6th Sector

7th Sector

8th Sector

See also
2008 French municipal elections
2008 Paris municipal election
2008 Lyon municipal election

Marseille municipal election
Marseille municipal election
Municipal elections in France